Rammstein is a German Neue Deutsche Härte band formed in Berlin in 1994. The band's lineup—consisting of lead vocalist Till Lindemann, lead guitarist Richard Kruspe, rhythm guitarist Paul Landers, bassist Oliver Riedel, drummer Christoph Schneider, and keyboardist Christian "Flake" Lorenz—has remained unchanged throughout their history. They were one of the first bands to emerge within the Neue Deutsche Härte genre, with their debut album leading the music press to coin the term, and their style of music has generally had a positive reception from music critics. Commercially, the band have been very successful, earning many No. 1 albums as well as gold and platinum certifications in countries around the world. Their grand live performances, which often feature pyrotechnics, have played a part in their popularity growth. Despite success, the band have been subject to some controversies, with their overall image and certain songs in specific having been subject to criticism. Rammstein have won several awards and honors and been nominated for two Grammy Awards.

Grammy Awards

|-
!scope="row"| 1999
| "Du hast"
| rowspan="2"| Best Metal Performance
| 
|-
!scope="row"| 2006
| "Mein Teil"
| 
|-
|}

Echo Awards
 Best video of the year for "Engel" in 1998.
 Best German artist exporting best abroad in 1999.
 Best German Artist 2002.
 Best Rock / Alternative / Metal Artist in 2005.
 Best German Live Artist 2005.
 Best Rock / Alternative / Metal Artist in 2006.
 Best German Rock / Alternative / Metal Artist in 2010.
 Best German video for the music video "Ich tu dir weh" in 2011.
 Best German artist exporting best abroad in 2012.
 Best Rock / Alternative Artist in 2012.

Kerrang! Awards
 Best live artist in 2002.
 Best inspiration in 2010.

World Music Awards
 Best-selling German artist in the world in 2005.
 Best-selling German artist in the world in 2010.

MTV Europe Music Awards
 Best German Artist in 2005.

International Music Awards
 Best live band in 2019.

Metal Hammer Awards
 Best album for "Liebe ist für alle da" in 2010.
 Best German group in 2012.
 God Of Riff for Richard Zven Kruspe in 2014.

UK Music Video Awards
 Best live concert for "Rammstein: Paris" in 2017.

Heavy Music Awards
 Best live band in 2020.

PRG Live Entertainment Awards
 Best artist management in 2006.

Emma Gaala Awards
 Best international artist in 2006.

Edison Awards
 Best alternative artist in 2006.

Swiss Music Awards
 Best international group in 2020.

Champion DVD
 Best musical DVD for "Völkerball" in 2007.

AntyRadio Rock Awards
 Best international rock album for "Rammstein" in 2020.
 Best rock hit for single "Ausländer" in 2020.
 Best rock group in 2020.

Berlin Music Video Awards
 Best Concept for "Zeit" in 2022 (pending)

Bravo Otto Awards
 Silver award for best rock group in 1997.
 Bronze award for best rock group in 2006.

Viva Comet Awards
 Best live group in 1997.
 Best progressive artist in 1998.
 Best german video for "Keine Lust" in 2005.

Metal Hammer Golden Gods Awards
 Best live group in 2012.

Bandit Rock Awards
 Best artist in 2012.
 Best international live artist in 2014.
 Best international live group in 2020.
 Best international album for the album "Rammstein" in 2020.
 Best international song for single "Deutschland" in 2020.

Hard Rock Awards
 Best rock group in 2001.

1Live Krone Awards
 Best live band/artist in 2005.

Agendainfo Awards
 Best concert in the Netherlands in 2010.
 Best live show in 2010.

Revolver Golden Gods Awards
 Best live artist in 2011.

Loudwire Music Awards
 Best video for "Mein Land" music video in 2011.

Prize Popculture
 Most impressive live show in 2017.
 Most impresive live show in 2022.

German Music Authors' Prize
 Prize for the best Rock / Metal composition in 2018.

Iberian Festival Awards
 Best international live performance in 2018.

ZD Awards
 Best tour of the year for "Stadium Tour" in 2019.

Berlin Monument Prize
 Ferdinand Von Quast medal in 2018.

Moscow Ticketing Awards
 Best seller for the Luzhniki Stadium concert sold out the first week of sales for the Stadium Tour in 2019.

Starcount Social Star Awards 
 German musician award in 2013.

Metal Storm Awards 
 Best industrial metal/cyber/electronic album for "Rammstein" in 2020.
 Best Video for "Deutschland" in 2020.

Žebřík Music Awards

!Ref.
|-
| 1999
| rowspan=3|Themselves
| rowspan=2|Best International Surprise
| 
| rowspan=12|
|-
| rowspan=9|2001
| 
|-
| Best International Group
| 
|-
| Till Lindemann
| Best International Male
| 
|-
| Mutter
| Best International Album
| 
|-
| rowspan=2|"Ich will"
| Best International Song
| 
|-
| Best International Video
| 
|-
| rowspan=2|"Sonne"
| Best International Song
| 
|-
| Best International Video
| 
|-
| "Mutter"
| Best International Song
| 
|-
| rowspan=2|2002
| "Feuer frei!"
| Best International Video
| 
|-
| rowspan=2|Themselves
| rowspan=2|Best International Group
| 
|-
| rowspan=6|2004
| 
| rowspan=21|
|-
| Till Lindemann
| Best International Male
| 
|-
| Reise, Reise
| Best International Album
| 
|-
| rowspan=2|"Amerika"
| Best International Song
| 
|-
| rowspan=2|Best International Video
| 
|-
| "Mein Teil"
| 
|-
| rowspan=9|2005
| rowspan=3|Themselves
| Best International Group
| 
|-
| Best International Surprise
| 
|-
| Best International Průser
| 
|-
| rowspan=2|Till Lindemann
| Best International Male
| 
|-
| Best International Personality
| 
|-
| Rosenrot
| Best International Album
| 
|-
| rowspan=2|"Benzin"
| Best International Song
| 
|-
| rowspan=2|Best International Video
| 
|-
| "Keine Lust"
| 
|-
| rowspan=2|2006
| Themselves
| Best International Group
| 
|-
| Völkerball
| Best International Music DVD
| 
|-
| rowspan=4|2009
| Themselves
| Best International Group
| 
|-
| Liebe ist für alle da
| Best International Album
| 
|-
| "Pussy"
| Best International Video
| 
|-
| "Roter Sand"
| Best International Song
| 
|-
| 2016
| Themselves
| Best International Group
| 
|

References

Awards
Lists of awards received by German musician
Lists of awards received by musical group